Austin Watson (born January 13, 1992) is an American professional  ice hockey left winger for the Ottawa Senators of the National Hockey League (NHL). He was selected 18th overall by the Nashville Predators in the 2010 NHL Entry Draft.

Early life
Austin Watson was born January 13, 1992, in Ann Arbor, Michigan, where he was raised by his father and mother, Mike and Mary Watson. He is the oldest of ten children, nine boys and one girl. He went to school one year at Detroit Catholic Central High School, and one year at Father Gabriel Richard High School before he was drafted into the OHL, where he attended St. Anne's High School, and after being traded to Peterborough, finishing high school there. Watson played for the high school golf team at Father Gabriel Richard, where they went to state finals.

Playing career

Junior
As a youth, Watson played in the 2005 Quebec International Pee-Wee Hockey Tournament with the Detroit Compuware Ambassadors minor ice hockey team.

Watson verbally committed to the University of Maine Black Bears college hockey program. Watson was selected by the Windsor Spitfires of the Ontario Hockey League (OHL) draft in the second round, 36th overall. Watson chose to play with Windsor, foregoing his verbal commitment to Maine. Watson surprised people with his fast skating and smart play in his rookie season. Despite the fact that Watson hit a slump mid-season, he came out with 10 goals and 19 assists, for a total of 29 points. During the playoffs, after a total of 20 games played, he snatched up 3 more points in the form of assists. He accompanied the Spitfires to becoming the most elite in the league, winning the OHL's J. Ross Robertson Cup, and were named the Canadian Hockey League's Memorial Cup champions. The team were at the same same time breaking the record and becoming the first team to ever come back for an overall win from fourth place in the finals. Also, it was the first Spitfires franchise win of the Memorial Cup. 

On January 11, 2010, the Spitfires traded Watson to the Peterborough Petes. The trade was to his benefit, as he received a chance at more playing time on this younger team. Watson played in the 2010 CHL Top Prospects game for Team Cherry, and played well, as he, among other things, broke up a 5-on-3 penalty kill, though he unfortunately broke his ankle blocking a second shot and missed a month with the Petes.

While playing with the Spitfires, Watson was projected to go 25th according to the International Scouting Service (ISS) in the 2010 NHL Entry Draft, but after an advantageous trade to the Petes, he jumped in rank to 14th in April, where the NHL Central Scouting Final Ranks placed him. According to the ISS, he ranked 12th. Watson was drafted in the first round, 18th overall by the Nashville Predators.

On January 9, 2012, the Petes traded Watson to the London Knights for Chase Hatcher and a series of draft picks. He won a second J. Ross Robertson Cup with the Knights that season, receiving playoff MVP honors. He became the first American to win OHL Playoff MVP honors. The Knights also took part in the Memorial Cup tournament that year, losing to the Shawinigan Cataractes in the championship game.

Professional
Watson began playing professionally during the 2012–13 season, where he scored 37 points in 72 games for the Predators' AHL affiliate, the Milwaukee Admirals. He also appeared in six games for the Predators, where he scored his first career NHL goal against Mikka Kiprusoff of the Calgary Flames on April 23, 2013. Watson became a regular in the Predators lineup during the 2015–16 NHL season, suiting up in 57 games, but was a healthy scratch many games. In the following season, on October 6, 2016 he was placed on waivers but went unclaimed. Watson skated in 77 games for the Predators that season, scoring 17 points. He also recorded 4 goals and 9 points in 22 playoff games, reaching the Stanley Cup Finals for the first time in franchise history. The Predators ultimately fell in six games to the Pittsburgh Penguins. He was used predominantly as a bottom-six forward by the Predators.

On July 24, 2017, the Predators re-signed Watson to a three-year, $3.3 million contract worth $1.1 million annually. In the 2017–18 season, Watson received his first NHL two-game suspension for boarding Colorado Avalanche forward Dominic Toninato on November 18, 2017. Watson missed the first 18 games of the 2018–19 season due to a suspension for non-hockey related reasons and on January 29, 2019, Watson was suspended indefinitely after an alcohol related relapse. After completing the NHL's substance abuse program, Watson was reinstated and assigned to Milwaukee on March 25, 2019. He was recalled by Nashville on April 2, 2019 after scoring four goals in two games with Milwaukee. On October 31, 2019, the Predators signed Watson to a three-year contract extension. In the 2019–20 season, Watson played in 53 games with the Predators scoring six goals and 14 points. He was also held scoreless in two playoff games.

Watson was traded by Nashville to the Ottawa Senators in exchange for a fourth-round selection in the 2021 NHL Entry Draft on October 10, 2020. He was used as a fourth-line winger and penalty killer by Ottawa. On February 13, 2022, Watson was suspended two games for interference on Boston Bruins defenseman Jack Ahcan.

International play

Watson was selected to play for the USA national under-18 select team for the 2009 Ivan Hlinka Memorial Tournament. Despite the fact that the US did not win, he played well, tying the US record for most points in a single game.

Watson was selected to play for the US national team at the 2010 World U18 Hockey Championships. Though the US team ultimately won the gold medal, Watson was ejected from the championship game 5 minutes in for a boarding call.

Domestic assault charge 
On June 16, 2018, Watson was arrested in Franklin, Tennessee, on a misdemeanour charge of domestic assault. According to the police report, an officer was flagged down after a witness reported seeing Watson "swat" his girlfriend, Jenn Guardino, and prevent her from leaving the couple's SUV at a gas station. According to the police report, when the officer arrived at the scene, he witnessed Guardino "trying to back away from being shoved, saying ‘stop’ and covering her face." At the time of the incident, Watson claimed he and Guardino were arguing about her drinking and not being able to attend a wedding. Watson admitted to pushing Guardino and the officer noted red marks on her chest. Guardino denied that Watson had touched her, but later changed her statement and told police that he was responsible for the marks on her chest. Guardino told police that Watson at times "gets handsy" and pleaded with officers not to press charges, fearing damage to his NHL career. Watson was subsequently charged with suspicion of domestic assault. The police report noted that Guardino became "extremely upset" when Watson was taken into custody.

On July 24, 2018, Watson pleaded no contest to the domestic assault charge. He was sentenced to one-year probation and ordered to complete a 26-week batterer intervention course. Violating his probation could earn Watson up to a year in jail time. As a result of his charge, Watson was suspended by the NHL from all 2018–19 preseason games and 27 regular season games. After appealing his suspension to an independent arbitrator, Watson's suspension was reduced to 18 games.

On October 13, 2018, Guardino issued a statement in which she took full blame for the June 16 incident, claiming that it was not an act of domestic violence and that Watson would never hit or abuse her. She attributed the incident entirely to her own drinking problem. In the public statement, Guardino apologized to everyone involved, including the Predators and the city of Nashville, and thanked Watson for his support. The statement read in part:

Career statistics

Regular season and playoffs

International

Awards and honors

References

External links
 
Austin Watson OHL Player Profile

1992 births
Living people
American men's ice hockey right wingers
London Knights players
Milwaukee Admirals players
Nashville Predators draft picks
Nashville Predators players
National Hockey League first-round draft picks
Ottawa Senators players
Peterborough Petes (ice hockey) players
Windsor Spitfires players